Kaleidoscope is an American heist drama television miniseries created by Eric Garcia. The eight-part series, unique for its shuffled order, centers around master thief Leo Pap (Giancarlo Esposito) and his crew attempting an epic heist worth $7 billion, but betrayal, greed and other threats undermine their plans.

Kaleidoscope was released on January 1, 2023, by Netflix.

Cast and characters

Main
 Giancarlo Esposito as Leo Pap / Ray Vernon, a career criminal and the leader of his heist crew, who aims to rob the SLS vault
 Rufus Sewell as Roger Salas / Graham Davies, Leo's former partner-in-crime and the CEO of "SLS", a corporate security firm
 Paz Vega as Ava Mercer, a lawyer, Leo's closest friend and the weapons specialist of Leo's crew
 Peter Mark Kendall as Stan Loomis, Leo's former cellmate and the smuggler for Leo's crew
 Rosaline Elbay as Judy Goodwin (née Strauss), Stan's ex-girlfriend and the explosives specialist of Leo's crew
 Jai Courtney as Bob Goodwin, Judy's husband and the safe cracker of Leo's crew
 Tati Gabrielle as Hannah Kim (née Vernon), Leo's pregnant daughter who works as the head of digital security at SLS
Austin Elle Fisher portrays a young Hannah Vernon

Recurring

 Jordan Mendoza as RJ Acosta Jr., the driver for Leo's Crew
 Hemky Madera as Carlos Sujo, Roger's right-hand man and fixer
 Soojeong Son as Liz Kim, Hannah's adoptive sister
 John Hans Tester as Stefan Thiele, one of "The Triplets", a trio of billionaires who entrust $7 billion worth of bearer bonds to SLS
 Niousha Noor as Nazan Abbasi, an FBI agent focused on investigating Leo's Crew
 Bubba Weiler as Samuel Toby, Abbasi's FBI partner

Guest starring
 Patch Darragh as Andrew Covington, the former head of digital security at SLS
 Richard Masur as Dr. Wagner, Leo's doctor during his incarceration
 Tina Benko as Jennifer Helman, Abbasi and Toby's superior in the FBI
 Whit Washing as Ted Gough, FBI agent assigned to the jewelry heist
 Robinne Lee as Lily Vernon, Leo's wife and Hannah's mother
 Max Casella as Taco, a criminal-for-hire
 Craig Walker as Samson, Taco's partner and a fellow criminal

Episodes 
All eight episodes can be watched in any order. An introduction ("Black") explains the show's concept. The episodes are listed here in the order listed on Netflix.

Production

Development 
On September 16, 2021, it was revealed that Netflix had given an eight-episode order for the series, then titled Jigsaw. Eric Garcia serves as creator, writer, and executive producer, along with EPs Ridley Scott, David W. Zucker, Jordan Sheehan, Fred Berger, Brian Kavanaugh-Jones, Justin Levy, and Russell Fine. The series is produced by Scott Free Productions and Automatik Entertainment. It was announced that Everardo Gout and Mairzee Almas would each direct two episodes. It was also announced Robert Townsend would direct multiple episodes of the series. The series is structured in a non-linear order so that viewers can choose the order in which they watch the episodes leading up to the finale.

Casting 
Alongside the series announcement, Giancarlo Esposito, Paz Vega, Rufus Sewell, Tati Gabrielle, Peter Mark Kendall, Rosaline Elbay, Jai Courtney, Niousha Noor, and Jordan Mendoza were cast.

Filming 
Filming began at Netflix Studios in Bushwick, Brooklyn on September 1, 2021. It is the first production at the Bushwick studio. Filming also took place at 28 Liberty in Manhattan's financial district. The series wrapped on March 16, 2022.

Release 
The series was officially titled Kaleidoscope in November 2022 when its release date was set for January 1, 2023.

Each episode bears a title associated with a hue or color, which distinctly relates to the main element of that particular episode. The story spans from twenty-four years before the heist to six months after the heist. Netflix tweeted suggestions of different orders in which viewers could watch the episodes; for example, as a Quentin Tarantino film, referencing nonlinear films of his like Pulp Fiction; or as a classic detective story. Netflix's approach of presenting the first seven episodes in any order followed by the White episode allows for 5,040 (7!) permutations. Watching all episodes (including "White") in any order allows for a total of 40,320 (8!). However, Dais Johnston of Inverse noticed that Netflix's recommended orders always ended with "Red" and "Pink" before "White", hinting at 120 (5!) permutations.

Reception

The review aggregator website Rotten Tomatoes reported a 50% approval rating with an average rating of 6.4/10, based on 34 critic reviews. The website's critics consensus reads, "While Kaleidoscope interactive storytelling offers some flashy novelty, its color-coded story strands are unfortunately all in service to a disappointingly pedestrian plot." Metacritic, which uses a weighted average, assigned a score of 59 out of 100 based on 14 critics, indicating "mixed or average reviews".

References

External links
 
 

2023 American television series debuts
2023 American television series endings
2020s American drama television miniseries
2020s American crime drama television series
American action television series
American thriller television series
English-language Netflix original programming
Heist fiction
Nonlinear narrative television series
Robbery in television
Television series by Scott Free Productions
Television shows filmed in New York City